Savkino is a rural locality (a village) in Yurovskoye Rural Settlement, Gryazovetsky District, Vologda Oblast, Russia. The population was 16 as of 2002.

Geography 
Savkino is located 21 km northwest of Gryazovets (the district's administrative centre) by road. Mokeyevo is the nearest rural locality.

References 

Rural localities in Gryazovetsky District